A rent-sangla scam, also known as rent-tangay scam, is a confidence trick that began to occur in the Philippines in early 2017.

According to local reports, victims of a so-called rent-sangla (rent-mortgage) scam said they later found out that they had fallen victim to fraudulent promises of rental income when they later found their vehicles had either been mortgaged or sold to different persons without their knowledge. Eight persons, five of them from Laguna province, had been charged for violations of Article 315 of the Philippines' Revised Penal Code (on swindling/estafa in large-scale form) and in relation to Presidential Decree 1689 (which increased the penalty of certain forms of swindling/estafa). Fearing that the suspects would leave the country, the victims asked the Department of Justice (DOJ) to issue immigration lookout bulletins/orders against suspects Martin Perez, Tychicus Historillo Nambio, Rafaela Anunciacion (the supposed mastermind of the scam), and Lea Constantino Rosales. DOJ Secretary Vitaliano Aguirre then announced that about 500 cars had already been seized by law enforcers in Cavite and Laguna.

Anunciacion was arrested on 2 March in Laguna by members of the Philippine National Police Regional Highway Patrol Group (PNP-HPG), but she was able to post a bail of ₱40,000. 200 complaints have been filed against Anunciacion and Nambio.

In mid-March 2017, Aguirre announced that the NBI would be filing its own complaint against the persons behind the scam. He also noted that 184 out of 300 vehicles snatched by the scheme have been returned to their respective owners. According to PNP-HPG, around 1,800 vehicles have reportedly been victimized by the scheme, but that 107 of confirmed 457 stolen vehicles were recovered during police operations in Metro Manila, Southern Tagalog, and Central Luzon.

On August 25, 2018, the alleged mastermind Rafaela Anunciacion was arrested again by the PNP-HPG.

References

Confidence tricks
2017 scandals
2017 crimes in the Philippines